Henry Traphagen (June 1, 1842 – October 11, 1918) was a lawyer and the  Mayor of Jersey City, New Jersey for the Democratic Party from May 4, 1874 to April 30, 1876.

Biography
He was born on June 1, 1842, in Jersey City to Henry Mackaness Traphagen and Sarah Conselyea. He had a brother, William C. Traphagen.  He was the great-grandson of former Jersey City mayor Cornelius Van Vorst.  He was a descendant of Willem Traphagen, from Lemgo, Lippe, who settled in Manhattan in 1652. He studied at Rutgers College and Brown University and became an attorney in 1864.

He married Annie Matilda Cambell (1847-1919) on November 9, 1869.

He was elected mayor and served one term, from May 4, 1874 to April 30, 1876.

He died on October 11, 1918 in Tenafly, New Jersey.

References

1842 births
1918 deaths
Rutgers University alumni
Brown University alumni
New Jersey lawyers
New Jersey Democrats
Mayors of Jersey City, New Jersey
19th-century American politicians
19th-century American lawyers